Vice-Admiral Sir Thomas Henry Eustace Baird KCB DL (born 17 May 1924) is a former Royal Navy officer who served as Flag Officer, Scotland and Northern Ireland.

Early life and naval career
Baird was born in Canterbury, Kent on 17 May 1924. Educated at the Royal Naval College, Dartmouth, Baird joined the Royal Navy in 1941 during World War II. He became Captain of the destroyer HMS Glamorgan in 1971. He was appointed Captain of the Fleet in 1973, Chief of Staff, Naval Home Command in 1976 and Director-General of Naval Personnel Services in 1978. He went on to be Flag Officer, Scotland and Northern Ireland in 1979 before retiring in 1982.

Baird was appointed a Knight Commander of the Order of the Bath (KCB) in the 1980 New Year Honours.

In retirement he was made Chairman of the Executive Committee of the Erskine Hospital in Renfrewshire. He also became Deputy Lieutenant of Ayrshire and Arran.

Personal life
In 1953 he married Angela Florence Ann Paul; they have one son and one daughter. Lady Baird died on 14 May 2009.

References

1924 births
Living people
Deputy Lieutenants of Ayrshire and Arran
Knights Commander of the Order of the Bath
Royal Navy vice admirals